Jessica Mauboy is an Australian recording artist, who became the runner-up for the fourth season of Australian Idol in 2006. She subsequently signed a recording contract with Sony Music Australia, and released her debut live album, The Journey, in February 2007. Mauboy has since released three studio albums, Been Waiting (2008), Get 'Em Girls (2010) and Beautiful (2013). Mauboy has won numerous awards, including an AACTA Award, APRA Award, Australian of the Year Award, MTV Australia Award, MTV Europe Music Award, two ARIA Music Awards, two Nickelodeon Australian Kids' Choice Awards, three NT Indigenous Music Awards, two NT Young Achiever Awards and nine Deadly Awards. Overall, she has won 40 awards from 108 nominations.

Music

APRA Awards
The APRA Awards are held in Australia and New Zealand by the Australasian Performing Right Association to recognise songwriting skills, sales and airplay performance by its members annually. Mauboy has won one award from four nominations.

|-
| 2009
| "Running Back" (featuring Flo Rida) 
| Urban Work of the Year 
| 
|-
|rowspan="3"| 2010  
| Herself 
| Breakthrough Songwriter of the Year 
| 
|-
|"Been Waiting" 
| Most Played Australian Work 
| 
|-
|"Running Back" (featuring Flo Rida) 
| Urban Work of the Year 
| 
|-
| 2020
| "Little Things"
| Song of the Year
| 
|-
| 2021
| "Selfish"
| Most Performed Pop Work
| 
|-
| 2022
| "First Nation" (Midnight Oil featuring Jessica Mauboy and Tasman Keith)
| Song of the Year
| 
|-

ARIA Music Awards

The ARIA Music Awards is an annual awards ceremony that recognises excellence, innovation, and achievement across all genres of Australian music. Mauboy has won two awards from 30 nominations.
 

|-
|rowspan="7"| 2009  
| "Running Back" (featuring Flo Rida) 
|rowspan="2"| ARIA Award for Highest Selling Single
| 
|-
| "Burn" 
| 
|-
|rowspan="3"| Been Waiting 
| ARIA Award for Highest Selling Album
| 
|-
| Best Pop Release 
| 
|-
| Breakthrough Artist – Album 
| 
|-
| "Running Back" (featuring Flo Rida) 
| ARIA Award for Breakthrough Artist – Single
| 
|-
| Been Waiting
| Best Female Artist 
| 
|-
|rowspan="2"| 2011
| "Saturday Night" (featuring Ludacris) 
| Highest Selling Single 
| 
|-
| Jessica Mauboy
| Most Popular Australian Artist 
| 
|-
|rowspan="3"| 2012
|rowspan="2"| "Gotcha"
| Best Female Artist
| 
|-
| Best Pop Release
| 
|-
| "Galaxy" (featuring Stan Walker)
| Song of the Year
| 
|-
| 2013
| "To the End of the Earth"
| Best Female Artist
| 
|-
| rowspan="3"| 2014
| rowspan="2"| Beautiful
| Album of the Year
| 
|-
| Best Female Artist
| 
|-
| "Never Be the Same"
| Best Video
| 
|-
| 2015
| "Can I Get a Moment?"
| Best Female Artist
| 
|-
| 2016
| "This Ain't Love"
| Best Female Artist
| 
|-
| rowspan="6"| 2017
| rowspan="2"| The Secret Daughter: Songs from the Original TV Series
| Best Female Artist
| 
|-
| Best Original Soundtrack or Musical Theatre Cast Album
| 
|-
| rowspan="3"| "Fallin'"
| Song of the Year
| 
|-
| Best Pop Release
| 
|-
| Best Video
| 
|-
| All The Hits Live Tour
| Best Australian Live Act
| 
|-
| 2018
| The Secret Daughter Season Two: Songs from the Original 7 Series
| Best Original Soundtrack or Musical Theatre Cast Album
| 
|-
|rowspan="2"| 2019
|rowspan="2"| "Little Things" 
| Best Female Artist
| 
|-
| Best Video
| 
|-
|rowspan="3"| 2020
|rowspan="3"| Hilda
| Album of the Year
| 
|-
| Best Cover Art
| 
|-
| Producer of the Year
| 
|-

ARIA No. 1 Chart Awards
The ARIA No. 1 Chart Awards are given to Australian recording artists who have achieved a number-one single or album on the ARIA Charts. Mauboy has won one award.

|-
| 2009 
| "Burn" 
| Number-one single 
|

Channel [V] Awards
The Channel V Oz Artist of the Year award is presented annually by Channel V Australia. Mauboy has been nominated four times.

|-
| 2011 
| rowspan="4"| Herself 
| rowspan="4"| [V] Oz Artist of the Year
| 
|-
| 2012
| 
|-
| 2013
| 
|-
| 2014
|

Cosmopolitan Fun, Fearless, Female Awards
The Cosmopolitan Fun, Fearless, Female Awards is an annual awards show presented by Cosmopolitan magazine to celebrate Australian women in television, music, sport and radio. Mauboy has won three awards from four nominations.

|-
| 2009 
| rowspan="4"| Herself 
| Favourite Singer 
| 
|-
| 2011 
| Most Inspirational Singer 
| 
|-
| 2013
| rowspan="2"| Singer
| 
|-
| 2014
|

Country Music Awards (CMAA) 
The Country Music Awards of Australia (CMAA) (also known as the Golden Guitar Awards) is an annual awards night held in January during the Tamworth Country Music Festival, celebrating recording excellence in the Australian country music industry. They have been held annually since 1973.

|-
|rowspan="2"| 2016 ||rowspan="2"| "Spirit of the Anzacs"   (with Lee Kernaghan, Guy Sebastian, Sheppard, Jon Stevens, Shannon Noll and Megan Washington)  || Vocal Collaboration of the Year || 
|-
| Video clip of the Year || 
|-

Deadly Awards
The Deadly Awards is an annual celebration of Aboriginal and Torres Strait Islander achievements in music, sport, entertainment and community. Mauboy has won nine awards from ten nominations.

|-
|2007 
| Herself 
| Artist of the Year 
| 
|-
|rowspan="3"| 2009
| "Burn" 
| Single Release of the Year 
| 
|-
| Been Waiting 
| Album of the Year 
| 
|-
| Herself 
| Female Artist of the Year 
| 
|-
| 2011
| rowspan="2"| Herself 
| rowspan="2"| Female Artist of the Year 
| 
|-
| rowspan="2"| 2012
| 
|-
| "Galaxy" (featuring Stan Walker) 
| Single of the Year 
| 
|-
| rowspan="2"| 2013
| Herself
| Female Artist of the Year
| 
|-
| "Something's Got a Hold on Me"
| Single Release of the Year
|

MTV Australia Awards
The MTV Australia Awards was an awards ceremony presented by channel MTV Australia that honoured the best music videos of both local and international acts. Mauboy won one award from two nominations.

|-
| rowspan="2"| 2009 
| "Running Back" (featuring Flo Rida) 
| Best Collaboration 
| 
|-
| Herself 
| Best Aussie 
|

MTV Europe Music Awards
The MTV Europe Music Awards is an awards ceremony presented by MTV Europe to honour the best music videos of both European and international acts. Mauboy has received one nomination.

|-
| 2017 
| Herself
| Best Australian Act
| 
|-

National Indigenous Music Awards
The National Indigenous Music Awards is an annual awards ceremony that recognises the achievements of Indigenous Australians in music. Mauboy has won five awards from sixteen nominations.

|-
| rowspan="1"|2007
| Herself 
| Act of the Year 
| 
|-
| rowspan="2"|2009
| Herself 
| Act of the Year 
| 
|-
| Been Waiting
| Album of the Year 
| 
|-
| rowspan="1"|2010
| Herself 
| Act of the Year 
| 
|-
| rowspan="2"|2011
| Herself 
| Act of the Year 
| 
|-
| Get 'Em Girls 
| Album of the Year 
| 
|-
| 2012
| rowspan="5"| Herself
| rowspan="5"| National Artist of the Year
| 
|-
| 2013
| 
|-
| 2014
| 
|-
| 2015
| 
|-
| 2017
| 
|-
| rowspan="2"|2018
| Herself 
| Act of the Year 
| 
|-
| "We Got Love"
| Film Clip of the Year 
| 
|-
| 2019
| Herself
| National Artist of the Year
| 
|-
| rowspan="2"|2020
| Herself 
| Act of the Year 
| 
|-
| Hilda
| Album of the Year 
| 
|-
| rowspan="1"|2021
| Herself 
| Artist of the Year 
| 
|-
| rowspan="2"| 2022
| Herself 
| Artist of the Year
| 
|-
| "Automatic"
| Film Clip of the Year
| 
|-

Nickelodeon Australian Kids' Choice Awards
The Nickelodeon Australian Kids' Choice Awards is an annual awards show that honours the year's biggest television, movie and music acts, as voted by the public. Mauboy has won two awards from five nominations.

|-
| 2008 
| rowspan="5"| Herself 
| So Hot Right Now 
| 
|-
|rowspan="2"| 2009  
| Fave Aussie Singer 
| 
|-
| Fave Aussie 
| 
|-
| 2010  
| rowspan="2"| Fave Aussie Musos 
| 
|-
| 2011
|

Nickelodeon US Kids' Choice Awards
The Nickelodeon US Kids' Choice Awards is an annual awards show that honours the year's biggest television, movie and music acts, as voted by the public. Mauboy has been nominated once for the US version of the award ceremony.

|-
| 2016 
| Herself 
| Favourite Pop Sensation
| 
|-
| 2018
| Herself
| Favourite Aussie/Kiwi Streaming Sensation
|

NT Indigenous Music Awards
The NT Indigenous Music Awards recognises excellence, dedication, innovation and outstanding contribution to the Northern Territory music industry. Mauboy has won three awards from five nominations.

|-
| 2007 
| rowspan="2"| Herself 
| rowspan="2"| Act of the Year 
| 
|-
|rowspan="3"| 2009 
| 
|-
| Been Waiting 
| Album of the Year 
| 
|-
| "Running Back" (featuring Flo Rida) 
| Single Release of the Year 
| 
|-
| 2010
| Herself 
| Act of the Year 
|

NT Young Achiever Awards
The purpose of the Northern Territory Young Achiever Awards is to acknowledge, encourage and most importantly promote the positive achievements of young Territorians up to and including 29 years of age as of 31 December each year. Jessica Mauboy was announced as winner of the Charles Darwin Arts Award category in 2004 and 2007.

PopRepublic.tv Awards
PopRepublic.tv is an Australian online entertainment magazine. Nominees for their annual awards are selected by the magazine, and winners are decided by public vote. Mauboy has won six awards from 14 nominations.

|-
|rowspan="3"|2010 
| Herself 
| Australian Female Artist 
| 
|-
| "Saturday Night" (featuring Ludacris) 
| Single of 2010 
| 
|-
| Get 'Em Girls 
| Album of 2010 
| 
|-
| rowspan="2"|2011
| Herself 
| Australian Female Artist 
| 
|-
| "Galaxy" (featuring Stan Walker) 
| Single of 2011 
| 
|-
| 2012
| Herself
| Favourite Australian Female Artist
| 
|-
| rowspan="3"| 2013
| Herself
| Favourite Australian Female Artist
| 
|-
| Beautiful
| Favourite Album of 2013
| 
|-
| To the End of the Earth Tour
| Favourite Concert Tour of 2013
| 
|-
| rowspan="2"| 2014
| Herself
| Favourite Australian Female Artist
| 
|-
| "Can I Get a Moment?"
| Favourite Single
| 
|-
| 2015
| "This Ain't Love"
| Favourite Single
| 
|-
| rowspan="2"| 2016
| Herself
| Favourite Australian Female Artist
| 
|-
| The Secret Daughter: Songs from the Original TV Series
| Favourite Album
| 
|-

World Music Awards
The World Music Awards is an international awards show that was established in 1989 to honour musicians based on their worldwide sales figures, which are provided by the International Federation of the Phonographic Industry (IFPI). Mauboy has received seven nominations.

|-
|rowspan="7"|2014
| rowspan="3"| Herself
| World's Best Female Artist
| 
|-
| World's Best Live Act
| 
|-
| World's Best Entertainer of the Year
| 
|-
| Beautiful
| World's Best Album
| 
|-
| "To the End of the Earth"
|rowspan="2"| World's Best Song
| 
|-
| rowspan="2"| "Pop a Bottle (Fill Me Up)"
| 
|-
| World's Best Video
|

Film and television

AACTA Awards
The AACTA Awards are presented annually by the Australian Academy of Cinema and Television Arts (AACTA), to recognise excellence in the Australian film and television industries. Mauboy won her first AACTA Award for Best Actress in a Supporting Role.

|-
| 2013
| The Sapphires
| Best Actress in a Supporting Role
|

AFCA Awards
The AFCA Awards are presented annually by the Australian Film Critics Association (AFCA), to recognise excellence in Australian and international films. Mauboy won her first AFCA Award for Best Actress in a Supporting Role.

|-
| 2013
| The Sapphires
| Best Actress in a Supporting Role
| 
|-

Deadly Awards

|-
| 2010
| Bran Nue Dae 
| Female Actress of the Year 
| 
|-

FCCA Awards
The FCCA Awards are presented annually by the Film Critics Circle of Australia (FCCA), to recognise excellence in Australian films and documentaries. Mauboy received her first nomination for Best Actress in a Supporting Role.

|-
| 2012
| The Sapphires
| Best Actress in a Supporting Role
| 
|-

Logie Awards
The Logie Awards is presented annually by TV Week magazine to recognise excellence in Australian television. Mauboy has been nominated once.

|-
| 2017
| The Secret Daughter
| Best Actress
| 
|-

Other

Australian of the Year Awards
The Australian of the Year Awards are presented annually by the National Australia Day Council (NADC), to recognise Australians for their achievements and ongoing contribution to the Australian community and nation. Mauboy has won one award from two nominations.

|-
| 2010
| rowspan="3"| Herself
| rowspan="2"| Young Australian of the Year
| 
|-
| rowspan="2"| 2013
| 
|-
| Northern Territory Young Australian of the Year
|

InStyle Women of Style Awards

|-
| rowspan="2"| 2014
| rowspan="2"| Herself 
| Entertainment Award
| 
|-
| Readers' Choice
|

References

Awards and nominations
Mauboy, Jessica